Josh Toy (born 18 April 1992) is a former professional Australian rules footballer who played for the Gold Coast Football Club in the Australian Football League (AFL). He was one of Gold Coast's underage recruits, and played in their first season. Toy was a part of Gold Coast's inaugural team in round 2, against , where he was utilized as a substitute player. During his time with the Suns, Toy was diagnosed with a heart condition (congenital heart block) which affected his endurance and aerobic capacity, without being a threat to his overall health.

During the 2012 Trade Period, Toy requested for a trade back to his home state of Victoria. After failing to arrange a trade deal, Toy was delisted by the Suns late in October 2012. Despite training with Richmond and being interviewed by several other Victorian clubs, Toy was not drafted in either the pre-season or rookie drafts.

Notes

External links

Josh Toy Player Profile, Gold Coast Suns

1992 births
Living people
Gold Coast Football Club players
Australian rules footballers from Victoria (Australia)
Calder Cannons players
People educated at Penleigh and Essendon Grammar School